Phillipsburg is a city in, and the county seat of, Phillips County, Kansas, United States.  As of the 2020 census, its population was 2,337.

History

Phillipsburg was organized in 1872 and named the county seat due to its central location in the county on July 26, though the first residents didn't arrive until late that year. It was named for politician and journalist William A. Phillips. Phillipsburg was incorporated as a city in 1880.

The first post office was established in Phillipsburg on December 23, 1872, with the first postmaster being Fred A Dutton, but the name of the post office was spelled Phillipsburgh until 1893. Named in honor of John Bissel, Fort Bissel was built in 1872 to protect against perceived hostility from Native Americans and closed in 1878. The Fort was reconstructed in city park in 1962. The first cemetery in the town, Close cemetery, was established on March 19, 1879 by the Fairview cemetery association and was deeded to the city on June 4, 1889. A branch of the Chicago, Kansas and Nebraska Railway was established through Phillipsburg in 1887. Also in 1887 complete telephone systems were installed in the city.  A fire nearly destroyed the entire town square in 1906. The current courthouse was constructed in 1912. "Kansas' Biggest Rodeo" was first held in 1929 and is held annually on the last weekend in July or first weekend in August.

In 1939, Consumer's Cooperative Association opened the world's first cooperative oil refinery on the north edge of town, and shutdown in 1992.

Geography
Phillipsburg is located at  (39.755173, -99.322331) in northwestern Kansas on the western edge of the Smoky Hills region of the Great Plains. Phillipsburg is located in the middle of Phillips County, approximately 20 miles south of the Nebraska border. The city sits on the north side of Deer Creek, a tributary of the North Fork of the Solomon River. Plotner Creek, a tributary of Deer Creek, flows south along the western edge of the city.

Climate
Phillipsburg's climate is either classified as a humid subtropical climate (Köppen Cwa), using the  isotherm of the original Köppen scheme, or a humid continental climate (Köppen Dwa), using the  isotherm preferred by some climatologists. Phillipsburg meets the criteria for a true winter dry season under the Köppen climate classification, which is a rarity for its region and for the United States as a whole outside of South Florida. The average temperature for the year in Phillipsburg is 51 °F (11 °C), and the average yearly precipitation is 23.3 inches (594 mm). On average, January is the coolest month, July is the warmest month, and May is the wettest month. The hottest temperature recorded in Phillipsburg was 120 °F (49 °C) in 1936; the coldest temperature recorded was -28 °F (-33 °C) in 1989.

Demographics

2010 census
As of the census of 2010, there were 2,581 people, 1,116 households, and 702 families residing in the city. The racial makeup of the city was 96.7% White, 0.5% African American, 0.2% Native American, 1.1% Asian, 0.4% from other races, and 1.1% from two or more races. Hispanic or Latino of any race were 2.6% of the population.

There were 1,116 households, of which 28.0% had children under the age of 18 living with them, 48.9% were married couples living together, 9.4% had a female householder with no husband present, 4.6% had a male householder with no wife present, and 37.1% were non-families. 34.0% of all households were made up of individuals, and 16.9% had someone living alone who was 65 years of age or older. The average household size was 2.25 and the average family size was 2.86.

The median age in the city was 43 years. 24.7% of residents were under the age of 18; 6.4% were between the ages of 18 and 24; 21.2% were from 25 to 44; 26.1% were from 45 to 64; and 21.7% were 65 years of age or older. The gender makeup of the city was 48.0% male and 52.0% female.

2000 census
As of the census of 2000, there were 2,668 people, 1,144 households, and 723 families residing in the city. There were 1,379 housing units at an average density of  861.9/sq mi (336.3/km). The racial makeup of the city was 97.5% White, 0.3% African American and 0.1% Native American. Hispanic or Latino of any race were 0.9% of the population.

There were 1,144 households, out of which 27.1% had children under the age of 18 living with them, 55.1% were married couples living together, 6.6% had a female householder with no husband present, and 36.8% were non-families. 34.1% of all households were made up of individuals, and 19.9% had someone living alone who was 65 years of age or older. The average household size was 2.25 and the average family size was 2.90.

In the city, the population was spread out, with 24.1% under the age of 18, 6.6% from 18 to 24, 23.4% from 25 to 44, 22.0% from 45 to 64, and 23.9% who were 65 years of age or older. The median age was 42 years. For every 100 females, there were 89 males. For every 100 females age 18 and over, there were 85 males.

The median income for a household in the city was $36,356, and the median income for a family was $43,816. Males had a median income of $30,898 versus $16,379 for females. The per capita income for the city was $17,902. About 6.2% of families and 10.3% of the population were below the poverty line, including 13.3% of those under the age of 18 and 10.1% of those 65 or over.

Education
Phillipsburg is home to USD 325.

The Phillipsburg Panthers have won the following Kansas State High School championships:
 2014 Boys Track & Field - Class 3A 
 2015 Football - Class 2-1A

Economy
TAMKO Building Products is now the largest manufacturer in the city.  In 2006, an ethanol plant was built at the east side of Phillipsburg.

Culture
The Riverless Festival is held in June and is a take on other communities that have river or lake festivals. Since Phillipsburg is a dry climate area, the city celebrates its lack of rivers in a tongue-in-cheek way through its annual Riverless Festival. The courthouse square hosts craft booths, food stands line the roads, and children line up for the games and rides, which are sponsored by local area businesses.

The rodeo is promoted as the biggest in Kansas. Phillipsburg hosts the rodeo each year, typically during the first week of August.

Notable people

Notable individuals who were born in or have lived in Phillipsburg include:
 McDill "Huck" Boyd, newspaper editor, Kansas politician
 Nelson B. McCormick, U.S. Representative from Kansas
 Wallace Pratt, geologist
 Mark Simoneau, former National Football League linebacker

References

Further reading

External links

 City of Phillipsburg
 Phillipsburg - Directory of Public Officials
 USD 325, local school district
 Phillipsburg city map, KDOT
 Kansas's Biggest Rodeo

Cities in Phillips County, Kansas
Cities in Kansas
County seats in Kansas
Populated places established in 1872
1872 establishments in Kansas